Wirt Virgin Cannell (January 23, 1880 – August 26, 1948) was an American professional baseball outfielder who played with the Boston Beaneaters of Major League Baseball in  and . He went to Tufts University in Massachusetts. He was born in Bridgton, Maine.

Sources

1880 births
1948 deaths
People from Bridgton, Maine
Baseball players from Maine
Major League Baseball outfielders
Boston Beaneaters players
Toledo Mud Hens players
Toronto Maple Leafs (International League) players
Lowell Tigers players
Trenton Tigers players
Williamsport Millionaires players
Chattanooga Lookouts players
Reading Pretzels players
Allentown (minor league baseball) players